Nick Krause (born April 14, 1992) is an American film and television actor. In 2014 Krause won Best Actor for his portrayal of Harlon in the film White Rabbit at the Boston and Catalina Film Festivals. Other roles include the film The Descendants (2011).

Early life and education
Krause was born in Austin, Texas, as the son of the talent agent Liz Atherton, and was raised in Georgetown. His sister is the actress Kate Krause. He attended NYOS Charter School and graduated early from Georgetown High School in order to begin the filming of The Descendants in Hawaii. He also attended a mathematics college course at the age of ten.  Krause is of part-Mexican descent.

Acting career
Krause's interest in acting began at the age of ten, when he attended an improvisation comedy workshop.

In 2014 Krause won Best Actor in the film White Rabbit for his portrayal of Harlon at the Catalina Film Festival. His other works include How to Eat Fried Worms (2006) as Nigel, in Homo Erectus (2007) as young Thudnik, in The Descendants (2011) as Sid and in the TV series Hollywood Heights (2012) as Adam. He also played Berto, Drew's college roommate, on the TV series Parenthood (2010).  Krause also had a small role in the 2014 film Boyhood.

Krause starred in the music video for the single, "Weekend"  by the band Priory, alongside Bailey Noble. In the clip, actors Nick Krause and Bailey Noble are teenagers who spend their mundane days toiling away at a roller rink. Nick daydreams of winning Bailey's affection by pulling some pretty slick skate moves on the floor, but in reality, as always, doesn't quite measure up.

Filmography

Film

Television

References

External links

Living people
American male film actors
American male television actors
1992 births
Male actors from Austin, Texas
American male child actors
American male actors of Mexican descent
21st-century American male actors
People from Georgetown, Texas